The women's team compound competition at the 2001 World Archery Championships took place in September 2001 in Beijing, China. 57 archers took part in the women's compound qualification round with no more than 4 from each country. All 10 eligible teams of 3 archers qualified for the 4-round knockout round, and were drawn according to their qualification round scores, with the highest 6 qualifiers getting a bye to the quarter finals.

Seeds
Seedings were based on the combined total of the team members' qualification scores in the individual ranking rounds. The 10 teams were assigned places in the draw depending on their overall ranking.

Draw

References

2001 World Archery Championships
World
Arch